Vesa Heikinheimo (born 10 May 1983) is a Finnish footballer who currently plays for the Veikkausliiga side FF Jaro. He has also represented FC Honka and FC Hämeenlinna earlier in his career.

Career
Heikinheimo played for TPS in the Veikkausliiga before suffering a knee injury in 2003. After recovering, TPS sent him on loan to 3rd division side KaaPo for the 2004 season.

References

External links
Profile at Soccerway

1983 births
Living people
Finnish footballers
Turun Palloseura footballers
Kaarinan Pojat players
FF Jaro players
FC Honka players
FC Hämeenlinna players
Veikkausliiga players
Association football defenders